The 2018 Conference USA women's soccer tournament was the postseason women's soccer tournament for Conference USA held from October 31 through November 4, 2018. The seven-match tournament took place at Old Dominion Soccer Complex in Norfolk, Virginia. The eight-team single-elimination tournament consisted of three rounds based on seeding from regular season conference play. The defending champions were the North Texas Mean Green, who defended their title after defeating the Southern Miss Golden Eagles in the final. The conference championship was the third for the North Texas women's soccer program, all three of which have come under the direction of head coach John Hedlund.

Bracket

Source:

Schedule

Quarterfinals

Semifinals

Final

Statistics

Goalscorers 
1 Goal
 Ola Akinniyi - Southern Miss
 Alexandra Augustyn - Louisiana Tech
 Hanna Banks - Louisiana Tech
 Lauryn Bruffett - North Texas
 Elizabeth Doll - Louisiana Tech
 Stephanie Garcia - Southern Miss
 Emma Grissom - Florida Atlantic
 Madeline Guderian - North Texas
 Tiril Haga - Florida Atlantic
 Amber Hoot - Middle Tennessee
 Amanda Nhek - Old Dominion
 Olivia Klein - North Texas
 Aaliyah Nolan - North Texas
 Mylene Roy-Ouellet - Louisiana Tech
 Carissa Sanders - North Texas
 Raegan Tate - Old Dominion
 Miah Zuazua - Southern Miss

All-Tournament team

Source:

Note: Offensive MVP shown in bold, defensive MVP shown in italics.

See also 
 2018 Conference USA Men's Soccer Tournament

References 

Conference USA Women's Soccer Tournament
2018 Conference USA women's soccer season